was a town located in Toyota District, Hiroshima Prefecture, Japan.

As of 2003, the town had an estimated population of 12,023 and a density of 184.74 persons per km². The total area was 65.08 km².

On February 7, 2005, Akitsu, along with the towns of Fukutomi, Kōchi, Kurose and Toyosaka (all from Kamo District), was merged into the expanded city of Higashihiroshima and no longer exists as an independent municipality.

Akitsu's local specialties include oysters and potatoes.

References

External links
 Official website of Higashihiroshima  (English content forthcoming)

Dissolved municipalities of Hiroshima Prefecture